The Ministry of Fisheries and Marine Resources Development (MFMRD, in Gilbertese, Botaki I bukin te aka sa ao karikirakean kaubwaira mai taari) is a government ministry of Kiribati, headquartered in South Tarawa.

Ministers
Taberannang Timeon (2007–2011)
Tetabo Nakara (2016–2020)
Ribanataake Tiwau (2020–)

External link
MFMRD

References
Presidency of Kiribati

Government of Kiribati
Fisheries ministries
Environment ministries